Mohammad Iqbal Sikander (born December 19, 1958 in Karachi, Sindh is a former Pakistani cricketer who played four One Day Internationals (ODI), all of them in the 1992 Cricket World Cup and was part of the Pakistan squad that won it, but he was never selected again for Pakistan in either Tests or ODIs. Currently, he is a coach for the Afghanistan national cricket team.

In January 1991, playing for Karachi Whites against Peshawar in a one-day match, he recorded the extraordinary bowling analysis of 6.2–3–7–7; no other cricketer has ever taken seven wickets in a List A game for the cost of fewer runs.

Iqbal spent a lot of time in English league cricket. In 2001, he took over 100 league wickets for Leigh Cricket Club in the Liverpool Competition.

Education
He was educated at the St. Patrick's High School, Karachi.

References 

1958 births
Living people
Pakistan One Day International cricketers
Cricketers at the 1992 Cricket World Cup
Cumberland cricketers
Pakistani cricketers
Pakistani cricket coaches
Pakistan International Airlines B cricketers
Pakistan International Airlines cricketers
Karachi cricketers
Karachi Whites cricketers
Karachi Blues cricketers
Hyderabad (Pakistan) cricketers
Bahawalpur cricketers
Cricketers from Karachi
St. Patrick's High School, Karachi alumni